Bryce Brothers, also known as Bryce Brothers Company and Bryce Brothers Company Inc., was a glass manufacturing company originating in 1850 at Birmingham, Allegheny County, Pennsylvania that changed names and partnerships until being purchased by the Bryce family when it was moved to Mount Pleasant, Pennsylvania, where they continued to produced blown crystal glassware until 1965.

Origins

James Bryce had been working in the glass industry since he was ten years old when his father, who was dying of lead poisoning as a result of his own work with glass, asked his employer, Mr. Bakewell, owner of the Bakewell Glass factory in Pittsburgh, Pennsylvania to apprentice his son, James with his company, Bakewell, Page and Bakewell. After working his way up to become one of several glassblowers, he would then spend 18 years as a journeyman. A panic in 1837 caused the glassworks to shut down and it would not be until 1845 until James Bryce would return to glass making. 

In 1850 James formed his first business venture along with partners with whom he was senior, named; Bryce, McKee & Company. Over a period of time the company would undergo many changes in name and partnerships that also included Bryce, Richards & Company, as well as Bryce, Walker & Company. William Walker sold out his interest in his partnership in "Bryce, Walker & Company" to partners James Bryce, Robert D. Bryce, Andrew H. Bryce and David K. Bryce. Other partners included James M. Bryce, Samuel A. Bryce, Frank G. Bryce as well as the grandsons of James Bryce that included Marion G. Bryce and Edwin W. Bryce. On June 13, 1882 the company reformed as simply Bryce Brothers.

References
3. https://historicpittsburgh.org/collection/bryce-brothers-lenox-incorporated-glass-records
Companies based in Pittsburgh
American companies established in 1882
Glassmaking companies
Glass artists